The 5th European Film Awards were presented on November 25, 1992, in Potsdam, Germany. The winners were selected by the members of the European Film Academy.

Awards

Best Film

Lifetime Achievement Award

References

External links 
 European Film Academy Archive

1992 film awards
European Film Awards ceremonies
Euro
1992 in Europe